Młynkowo may refer to the following places:
Młynkowo, Czarnków-Trzcianka County in Greater Poland Voivodeship (west-central Poland)
Młynkowo, Szamotuły County in Greater Poland Voivodeship (west-central Poland)
Młynkowo, Lubusz Voivodeship (west Poland)